Forever alone may refer to:

"Forever Alone", a song by Kakkmaddafakka from the 2013 album Six Months Is a Long Time
"Forever Alone", a song by Paulo Londra from the 2019 album Homerun
Forever Alone, Immortal, début album by the Polish symphonic black metal band Lux Occulta
"FA" and "Forever Alone", alternative terms to describe involuntary celibates